Peter Martin Welsh (born 19 July 1959) is a Scottish former footballer, who played for Leicester City in the Football League and Hibernian, Falkirk and Alloa Athletic in the Scottish Football League.

References

1959 births
Living people
Footballers from Coatbridge
Association football defenders
Scottish footballers
Leicester City F.C. players
Hibernian F.C. players
Falkirk F.C. players
Alloa Athletic F.C. players
Nuneaton Borough F.C. players
English Football League players
Scottish Football League players